"Never Too Old" is the last episode of the ninth and final series of the British comedy series Dad's Army. It was originally transmitted on Sunday 13 November 1977, the same day of the Remembrance Sunday 1977 Commemorations. The final ever episode marked the last regular appearances of Arthur Lowe (Captain George Mainwaring), John Le Mesurier (Sergeant Arthur Wilson), Clive Dunn (Lance Corporal Jack Jones), John Laurie (Private James Frazer), Arnold Ridley (Private Charles Godfrey) and Ian Lavender (Private Frank Pike).

Synopsis 
A wedding between Lance Corporal Jones and Mrs Fox is announced and takes place, but the reception is interrupted as the platoon are put on full invasion alert.

Plot 
Mrs Fox stops by the church hall in search of Lance Corporal Jones, but she is met by Private Godfrey, who tells her that the rest of the platoon has gone for a march and will not be back for some time. Mrs Fox then tells Godfrey that she was going to call Jones to "put him out of his misery."

When the Platoon arrive back, they notice that Jones is missing. Pike and Fraser then reveal that he failed to turn right on the march and just kept walking straight. Jones then arrives late in a very cheerful mood and asks Mainwaring for a private talk. He reveals to Mainwaring and Wilson that he has asked Mrs Fox to marry him and wants Mainwaring's permission to do so. Mainwaring agrees, and Mrs Fox telephones and tells Jones that she will marry him.

At the wedding ceremony, Mainwaring has agreed to give Mrs Fox away and Wilson has agreed to be best man. The reception follows, and Mainwaring is surprised when Wilson turns up in his uniform from the First World War (having been forced to so by Mrs Pike who has hidden his trousers), revealing he was a captain. Wilson is then surprised when he learns he must toast the matron of honour, Mrs Pike.

A much-needed change of pace is welcome when everyone celebrated the happiness of the wedding, but it is drastically cut short when the Colonel informs Mainwaring of an invasion alert and thinks it may not be a bluff. Jones and Pike are then sent to keep watch at the pier where Mrs Fox comes to meet them. While Jones and Mrs Fox are discussing their future, Mainwaring and the rest of the platoon arrive with a bottle of champagne to drink to Jones' good health. Hodges interrupts them and tells them that the invasion alert was a false alarm and the stand down order had been given half an hour earlier. Hodges claims it is just as well, because Mainwaring and his platoon would be "no good" against real soldiers. After Hodges leaves, Mainwaring, Wilson, Jones, Fraser, Pike and Godfrey all agree that "no-one is getting past them" and that there are "hundreds of men just like them" who are willing to fight for their freedom.

In the end, Wilson suggests that they make a toast to the Home Guard. Mainwaring agrees and the platoon raise their glasses as they turn towards the camera to say in unison: "To Britain's Home Guard".

Cast
Arthur Lowe as Captain Mainwaring
John Le Mesurier as Sergeant Wilson
Clive Dunn as Lance Corporal Jones
John Laurie as Private Frazer
Arnold Ridley as Private Godfrey
Ian Lavender as Private Pike
Bill Pertwee as ARP Warden Hodges
Frank Williams as The Vicar
Edward Sinclair as The Verger
Pamela Cundell as Mrs Fox
Janet Davies as Mrs Pike
Colin Bean as Private Sponge
Joan Cooper as Dolly
Robert Raglan as The Colonel

Notes
This episode was re-broadcast on BBC One on Monday 8 May 1995, as part of the programming celebrating the 50th anniversary of VE Day.
Last regular appearances of Arthur Lowe as Captain George Mainwaring, John Le Mesurier as Sergeant Arthur Wilson, Clive Dunn as Lance Corporal Jack Jones, John Laurie as Private James Frazer, Arnold Ridley as Private Charles Godfrey and Ian Lavender as Private Frank Pike.
Arthur Lowe (Mainwaring) died on 15 April 1982, John Le Mesurier (Wilson) died on 15 November 1983, Clive Dunn (Jones) died on 6 November 2012, John Laurie (Frazer) died on 23 June 1980 and Arnold Ridley (Godfrey) died on 12 March 1984. Ian Lavender (Pike) remains the last surviving cast member of Dad’s Army.

References

External links

Dad's Army (series 9) episodes
1977 British television episodes
British television series finales